The Central European Olympiad in Informatics (CEOI) is an annual informatics competition for secondary school students. Each of the participating central European countries (plus one or two guest countries, and a local team from the host area) sends a team of up to four contestants, a team leader and a deputy team leader. The contestants compete individually, i.e. a team score is not calculated. Competitors are selected through national competitive programming contests.

The contest consists of two days computer programming, solving problems of an algorithmic nature. The structure of these competition days is described in the article about the International Olympiad in Informatics (IOI), which served as a role model for the more local CEOI.

The first CEOI was held in 1994 in Romania (founder of the CEOI), five years after the first IOI.

List of CEOI websites and locations 
 CEOI 2021 was supposed to be held in Zagreb, Croatia, was held online instead (1- 5 September 2021).
 CEOI 2020 was held in Nagykanizsa, Hungary (23 - 29 August 2020).
 CEOI 2019 was held in Bratislava, Slovakia (23 - 29 July 2019).
 CEOI 2018 was held in Warsaw, Poland (12 - 18 August 2018).
 CEOI 2017 was held in Ljubljana, Slovenia (10 - 15 July 2017). Results
 CEOI 2016 was held in Piatra Neamț, Romania (18 - 23 July 2016). Participants: Bulgaria, Croatia, Czech Republic, Georgia, Germany, Hungary, Moldova, Poland, Romania, Slovakia, Slovenia, Switzerland.
 CEOI 2015 was held in Brno, Czech Republic (29 June - 4 July 2015). Participants: Croatia, Czech Republic, Georgia, Germany, Hungary, Poland, Romania, Slovakia, Slovenia, Switzerland.
 CEOI 2014 was held in Jena, Germany (18 - 24 June 2014).
 CEOI 2013 was held in Primošten, Croatia (13 - 19 October 2013). Participants: Croatia, Czech republic, Germany, Hungary, Poland, Romania, Switzerland, Slovakia and Slovenia.
 CEOI 2012 was held in Tata, Hungary (7-13 July 2012). Participants: Bulgaria, Croatia, Czech Republic, Germany, Hungary, Poland, Romania, Israel, Switzerland, The Netherlands, Slovakia and Slovenia.
 CEOI 2011 was held in Gdynia, Poland (7-12 July 2011). Participants: Bulgaria, Croatia, Czech Republic, Germany, Hungary, Poland, Romania, Slovakia, Slovenia and Switzerland.
 CEOI 2010 was held in Košice, Slovakia (12-19 July 2010). Participants: Bulgaria, Croatia, Czech Republic, Germany, Hungary, Poland, Romania, Slovakia, and Switzerland.
 CEOI 2009 was held in Târgu Mureş, Romania (8-14 July 2009). Participants: Croatia, Czech Republic, Germany, Hungary, Poland, Romania, Slovakia, Switzerland, USA., Serbia, Moldova.
 CEOI 2008 was held in Dresden, Germany (6-12 July 2008). Participants: Croatia, Czech Republic, Germany, Hungary, Israel, Poland, Romania, Saxony, Slovakia.
 CEOI 2007 was held in Brno, Czech Republic (1 - 7 July 2007). Participants: Croatia, Czech Republic, Germany, Hungary, Poland, Romania, Slovakia, Czech Republic II, Brno.
 CEOI 2006 was held in Vrsar, Croatia (1 - 8 July 2006). Participants: Croatia, Czech Republic, Germany, Hungary, Poland, Romania, Slovakia, Croatia II, Croatia III.
 CEOI 2005 was held in Sárospatak, Hungary (28 July - 5 August, 2005). Participants: Bosnia and Herzegovina, Croatia, Czech Republic, Estonia, France, Germany, Hungary, Poland, Romania, Sárospatak, Slovakia, Spain, The Netherlands.
 CEOI 2004 was held in Rzeszów, Poland (13 July - 17 July 2004). Participants: Bosnia & Herzegovina, Croatia, Czech Republic, Germany, Hungary, Poland, Romania, Slovakia
 CEOI 2003 was held in Münster, Germany (5 - 12 July 2003). Participants: Croatia, Poland, Czech Republic, Slovenia, Netherlands, USA, Hungary, Slovakia, Romania, Iran, Germany, Westphalia
 CEOI 2002 was held in Košice, Slovakia (30 June - 6 July 2002). Participants: Austria, Croatia, Czech Republic, Germany, Hungary, Poland, Romania, Slovakia, Slovenia, The Netherlands, Iran
 CEOI 2001 was held in Zalaegerszeg, Hungary (10 - 17 August 2001). Participants: Austria, Croatia, Czech Republic, Germany, Hungary, Poland, Romania, Slovakia, Slovenia, Estonia, Finland, Italy, The Netherlands
 CEOI 2000 was held in Cluj-Napoca, Romania (24 - 31 August 2000). Participants: Croatia, Czech Republic, Germany, Hungary, Moldova, Netherlands, Poland, Romania, Slovakia, Slovenia, USA
 CEOI 1999 was held in Brno, Czech Republic (2 - 9 September 1999). Participants: Bosnia-Herzegovina, Croatia, Czech Republic, Germany, Hungary, Poland, Romania, Slovakia, Slovenia, USA
 CEOI 1998 was held in Zadar, Croatia (20 - 27 May 1998). Participants: Bosnia-Herzegovina, Croatia, Czech Republic, Germany, Hungary, Poland, Romania, Slovakia, Slovenia
 CEOI 1997 was held in Nowy Sącz, Poland (17 - 24 July 1997). Participants: Belarus, Croatia, Estonia, Germany, Hungary, Latvia, Lithuania, Netherlands, Poland, Romania, Slovakia, Ukraine, USA, Yugoslavia
 CEOI 1996 was held in Bratislava, Slovak Republic (9 - 13 October 1996). Participants: Croatia, Czech Republic, Hungary, Poland, Romania, Slovakia, Slovenia
 CEOI 1995 was held in Szeged, Hungary (29 May - 3 June 1995). Participants: Belarus, Croatia, Czech Republic, Estonia, Hungary, Lithuania, Poland, Romania, Slovakia, Ukraine, Yugoslavia
 CEOI 1994 was held in Cluj-Napoca, Romania (27 - 31 May 1994). Participants: Croatia, Czech Republic, Hungary, Moldova, Poland, Romania, Turkey, Yugoslavia

See also 
 International Science Olympiads
 International Olympiad in Informatics
 USA Computing Olympiad

External links 

 CEOI archives
 International Science Olympiads

Informatics
Information technology organizations based in Europe
Programming contests